Peter McGibbon (August 19, 1873 – October 10, 1936) was a Canadian politician.

Biography
Born in St. Thomas, Ontario, McGibbon was a physician by profession. During World War I, he was a medical officer with the 1st Black Watch and the 8th Royal Berkshire Regiment. He was awarded the Military Cross in 1915. A city councillor for the city of Bracebridge, Ontario, he was first elected to the House of Commons of Canada for the electoral district of Muskoka in 1917 as a Unionist. He was defeated in 1921 but was re-elected in 1925 as a Conservative for the newly created electoral district of Muskoka—Ontario. He was defeated in 1935.

References
 

Conservative Party of Canada (1867–1942) MPs
Members of the House of Commons of Canada from Ontario
People from St. Thomas, Ontario
Canadian recipients of the Military Cross
1873 births
1936 deaths